The 1978 US Indoor Championships was a women's singles tennis tournament played on indoor carpet courts at the Met Center in Bloomington, Minnesota in the United States. The event was part of the AAAA category of the 1978 Colgate Series. It was the 70th edition of the tournament and was held from October 9 through October 15, 1978. Second-seeded Chris Evert won the singles title and earned $20,000 first-prize money.

Finals

Singles
 Chris Evert defeated  Virginia Wade 6–7(4–7), 6–2, 6–4
It was Evert's 5th singles title of the year and 83rd of her career.

Doubles
 Kerry Reid /  Wendy Turnbull defeated  Lesley Hunt /  Ilana Kloss 6–3, 6–3

Prize money

Notes

References

External links
 ITF tournament details
 WTA tournament details

US Indoor Championships
US Indoor Championships
1978 in sports in Minnesota
Tennis in Minnesota
1978 in American tennis